Central Scientific Instruments Organisation is a Chandigarh, India-based national laboratory dedicated to research, design and development of scientific, and industrial instruments. It is one of the constituent laboratories of the Council of Scientific and Industrial Research (CSIR), an Indian industrial research and development organisation situated at Chandigarth's Sector 30C.

Overview
CSIO was established in October 1959 as a laboratory that works on the research, design, and development of scientific and industrial instruments.  It was located in New Delhi, and then moved to Chandigarh in 1962. The first Director was Piara Singh Gill. CSIO campus (spread over an area of approximately 120 acres) comprises office buildings, R&D laboratories, Indo-Swiss Training Centre and a housing complex. A  building and the accompanying workshops were inaugurated in December 1967. Another block was added in 1976 for housing the R&D Divisions and library. During the mid-1980s the laboratory buildings and infrastructural facilities were modernized. An Administration Block was inaugurated in September 1994.

With a view to meeting the demand for instrument technologists, the Indo-Swiss Training Centre (ISTC) was started in December 1963 with the cooperation of the Swiss Foundation for Technical Assistance, Zurich, Switzerland.

CSIO is under the Physical Sciences Cluster of CSIR. CSIR-CSIO has signed an MoU with CSIR-IMTECH Chandigarh on 28 April 2012 for collaborative research work.

CSIO has infrastructural facilities in the areas of microelectronics, optics, applied physics, electronics, and mechanical engineering. R&D programmes are in food & agriculture, health and rehabilitation, avionics, snow and seismic monitoring in the strategic sector, landslide and structure health monitoring for public safety, and bio and nanosciences.

A large number of instruments have been developed by the Institute and their know-how has been passed on to the industry for commercial exploitation.

The laboratory provides a two-year postgraduate research programme in Engineering (PGRPE) in 'Advanced Instrumentation Engineering' the only such program in India. The students are designated as Quick Hire Scientist Trainee QHS(T). The areas of research are Optics and Photonics, Bio-Medical Instrumentation and Agrionics. After the completion of 1-year course work taught by the senior scientists of the organization, they are given a one-year project work as their thesis.

Campus
CSIO campus is situated on the Ambala-Chandigarh highway which houses the laboratories and workshops, Indo-Swiss Training Centre (ISTC) and residential complex. Amenities on campus include Clinical Centre, Crèche, Community Centre, Health Club and Adult Park. There are 250 dwelling units catering for the employees. A hostel is available for students from engineering institutions and universities undergoing their thesis/project/training. A guest-house with 16 rooms is on campus. A canteen facility exists for all the employees and students.

The vacant Type-I accommodation in the campus is being renovated with a provision for the internet facility for accommodating the Scientist Trainees and a 50-room hostel is proposed to be constructed for them. Dining and Common Room facilities would be provided in for Scientist Trainees.

Laboratories
CSIO has labs engaged in R&D programmes of the institute. A number of these labs and facilities have been earmarked for carrying out research/project/thesis of MTech/PhD level scholars. They can accommodate additional 3-5 Scientist Trainees each while a similar number would be allowed from other institutions. Three basic (common to all streams) labs exist (already catering MTech (Mechatraonics) students). Additional two labs are easily configurable from the related R&D groups.

In all the three departments for the chosen streams, sitting space for accommodating the Scientist Trainees is being created with office amenities including computer, internet, printing, phone/fax facility. The CSIO's IT cell would extend the services to the Scientist Trainees. Similarly, administrative requirements including national travel and outstation stay/accommodation of the TSs would be met initially by the existing CSIO establishments till independent arrangements are made. The Scientist Trainees would be considered as team members for international collaborations and funds for fees/travel/etc would be sought from different sources including CSIO/CSIR and other government funding schemes.

Library
CSIO library has a seating capacity of about 40 persons and has 50,000 books and standards covering science, engineering, technology, management and multidisciplinary areas. 92 journals are subscribed by the library and there is access to 2000 online e-journals within the campus. The library has arrangements with other local institutions as well as the National Institute of Science Communication and Information Resources (NISCAIR) for the emergent requirement of literature and books.

Faculty
CSIO has been playing a role in human resource development in terms of running MTech (Instrumentation) affiliated to Panjab University (PU), Chandigarh which was initiated at CSIO in 1994 and was run by the CSIO faculty using internal laboratory facilities for three consecutive years before it was shifted to PU. The scientists here were also involved in the conception, design and implementation of another programme [MTech (Microelectronics)] programme in 1998 in association with Semiconductor Complex Ltd (now called Semiconductor Laboratory), Mohali (Pb) being run by PU, Chandigarh. Another Masters programme [MTech(Nanosciences)] has been initiated in 2006 in PU, Chandigarh.

CSIO has jointly initiated an MTech (Mechatronics) programme with Central Mechanical Engineering Research Institute (CMERI), Durgapur and Central Electronics Engineering Research Institute (CEERI), Pilani in affiliation with Indian Institute of Engineering Science and Technology, Shibpur, Kolkata formerly known as Bengal Engineering Science University (BESU). This programme is run jointly by the faculty of all the four institutions involved.

Scientists supervise project training and thesis work of a large number of B.Tech and MTech students respectively. A number of Junior Research Fellows (JRFs) and Senior Research Fellows (SRFs) pursue their research work at CSIO for MTech/PhD.

CSIO has MoUs with universities, institutions and industries resulting in a regular flow of students and research problems. CSIO scientists are members of Boards of Studies (BoSs) and Research Degree Committees (RDCs) of universities and institutions. Scientists have been identified to serve as faculty at CSIO Chandigarh. They comprise PhDs and MTechs and some of them are pursuing their PhD. All are MTechs and PhDs from institutions such as IITs, BITS, and NITs. Some of them have gained experience as post-doctorates from abroad.

International research publications have emanated from the research work carried out by the scientists. About a dozen PhDs have been supervised by some of the senior faculty members in the last decade while currently more than 20 PhDs and about 35 MTech students are pursuing their thesis. The January session in 2011 attracted the registration of six PhDs in the organisation in both science and engineering. In the last few years, more than 50 patents have been filed by them and granted while many are under process.

Major R&D areas
 Strategic and Defence Applications
 Optics & Opto-Electronics
 Holography and displays 
 Computational Instrumentation
 Geo-Scientific Instrumentation
 Medical Instrumentation
 Analytical Instrumentation
 Agri-Electronic Instrumentation
 Energy Management, Condition Monitoring & Quality Control
 Environmental Monitoring Instrumentation
 Microelectro Mechanical Systems (MEMS) and Sensors
 Biomolecular Electronics and Nanotechnology

Departments

Verticals
  Agrionics
 Bio-Medical Instrumentation
 Optical Devices & Systems
  Advanced Materials & Sensors
  Precision Mechanical Systems

Horizontals
  Ubiquitous Analytical Techniques and R&D Support Facilities
  Computational Instrumentation
  Human Resource Development
  Knowledge Resource Management
  Engineering Services

Courses
The degree in the following courses is provided by the Academy of Scientific and Innovative Research (AcSIR).
 PhD in Engineering - a master's degree in Engineering/Technology/Pharmacy with a good academic record who have secured master's degree admission based on GATE score or valid CSIR-SRF or equivalent fellowship. 
 PhD in Science - candidates with master's degree in Science or bachelor's degree in Engineering or Medicine having a National level fellowship (JRF/SRF of funding agencies), INSPIRE or other equivalent fellowships.
 Integrated M.Tech. and PhD in Engineering (formerly, Postgraduate Research Programme in Engineering (PGRPE)) - AcSIR admits candidates into the five-year integrated M. Tech and PhD Program. Candidates do have an exit option after completion of M.Tech. part of the program.

Indo-Swiss Training Centre
 Four years Advanced Diploma in "Die and Mould Technology"
 Four years Advanced Diploma in Mechatronics and Industrial Automation
 Three years diploma in Instrument Technology
From 2013, 
 Three years Diploma in "Die and Mould Technology"
 Three years Diploma in Mechatronics and Industrial Automation
One year post graduation diploma in Cad-Cam and Mechatronics.
Indo Swiss Training Centre (ISTC) was established in the year 1963 in collaboration with the Swiss Foundation for Technical Assistance, Switzerland . ISTC was formally inaugurated on 18 the December 1963 by the first Prime Minister, Pandit Jawahar Lal Nehru. Established under the patronage of Swiss Foundation it is being run under the aegis of Central Scientific Instruments Organization (CSIO), Chandigarh, a constituent laboratory of Council of Scientific and Industrial Research (CSIR), New Delhi.

ISTC today is a training centre of repute in the field of Technical Training. The Indian industry had been impressed with the performance of ISTC and even today after 44 years of its inception, the centre has maintained an excellent quality of training. The basic aim of this training is skills. All the trainees work on machines individually and are trained to execute industrial jobs and face real life work environment. Stress is laid on the development of attitude such as punctuality, cleanliness, housekeeping, obedience, prior in labour, commitment etc. There exists a perfect spirit of teamwork among trainees and staff. Behaviour and discipline of trainee are closely monitored and recorded. A rigid system of performance evaluation has been devised to maintain the quality of training.

Programmes and Workshops
Recently from the year 2014 Faculty development motivational programme for Government schools has been started. CSIO has adopted a government school to provide the knowledge and promoting science to the faculties as well as students.

References

External links
Official site
Scientific Instruments

Council of Scientific and Industrial Research
Research institutes in Chandigarh
Scientific organisations based in India
1959 establishments in Delhi
Educational institutions established in 1959